Kevin Mahan (born August 3, 1969) is an American politician who served in the Indiana House of Representatives for the 31st district from 2010 to 2019.

References

1969 births
Living people
Republican Party members of the Indiana House of Representatives
21st-century American politicians